The Indian Arts and Crafts Act of 1990 (P.L. 101-644) is a  truth-in-advertising law which prohibits misrepresentation in marketing of American Indian or Alaska Native arts and crafts products within the United States. It is illegal to offer or display for sale, or sell any art or craft product in a manner that falsely suggests it is Indian produced, an Indian product, or the product of a particular Indian or Indian Tribe or Indian arts and crafts organization, resident within the United States. For a first time violation of the Act, an individual can face civil or criminal penalties up to a $250,000 fine or a five-year prison term, or both. If a business violates the Act, it can face civil penalties or can be prosecuted and fined up to $1,000,000.

The law covers all Indian and Indian-style traditional and contemporary arts and crafts produced after 1935. The Act broadly applies to the marketing of arts and crafts by any person in the United States. Some traditional items frequently copied by non-Indians include Indian-style jewelry, pottery, baskets, carved stone fetishes, woven rugs, kachina figures, and clothing.

The Indian Arts and Crafts Board, an agency established in 1934, has responsibility for overseeing the implementation of the Act.

Definitions
The US Department of the Interior explicitly states on its informational website about the Act that, "Under the Act, an Indian is defined as a member of any federally or State recognized Indian Tribe, or an individual certified as an Indian artisan by an Indian Tribe."

In Section 309.2, the Act defines an "Indian tribe" as:
(1) Any Indian tribe, band, nation, Alaska Native village, or any organized group or community which is recognized as eligible for the special programs and services provided by the United States to Indians because of their status as Indians; or (2) Any Indian group that has been formally recognized as an Indian tribe by a State legislature or by a State commission or similar organization legislatively vested with State tribal recognition authority.

All products must be marketed truthfully regarding the Indian heritage and tribal affiliation of the producers, so as not to mislead the consumer. It is illegal to market an art or craft item using the name of a tribe if a member, or certified Indian artisan, of that tribe did not actually create the art or craft item.

Section 309.4 of the act also allows for individuals with tribal ancestry who are not eligible for enrollment to be designated as "an Indian artisan by a particular tribe". The certification must be documented in writing by the tribal government.

The Act does not apply to services as was revealed by the judgement in a case against James Arthur Ray.

Controversy
Cultural anthropologist and attorney Gail Sheffield and others claim that this law has had "the unintended consequence of sanctioning discrimination against Native Americans whose tribal affiliation was not officially recognized". Those who claim to be Native artists but are not enrolled in a tribe run the risk of fines or imprisonment if they continue to sell their art while claiming Native heritage.

See also
 Certificate of Degree of Indian Blood
 Cultural appropriation
 Indigenous intellectual property
 List of Alaska Native tribal entities
 List of federally recognized tribes
 State recognized tribes in the United States
 Native American flute
 Protected Geographical Status, a similar legal requirement of authenticity in the European Union
 Terroir
 Title 25 of the Code of Federal Regulations

References

External links
US Code Collection: Title 25—Indians, Chapter 7A—Promotion of Social and Economic Welfare. Cornell University Law School.
Page 785 of the Act (pdf file, section 309.2 contains the specific definitions)

Native American art
United States federal Native American legislation
United States federal intellectual property legislation
United States trademark law
Country of origin
101st United States Congress